Ayouba Kosiah (born 22 July 2001) is a professional footballer who plays as a forward for Belgian club Beerschot . Born in the Netherlands, he represents the Liberia national team.

Career
A youth product of FC Utrecht and Almere City, Kosiah signed a professional contract with NAC Breda on 8 August 2021. He made his professional debut with NAC Breda in a 2–2 Eerste Divisie tie with VVV-Venlo on 8 August 2021.

International career
Born in the Netherlands, Kosiah is of Liberian descent. He made his international debut for Liberia in a 2–0 World Cup qualifying loss to Nigeria on 3 September 2021.

References

2001 births
Living people
People with acquired Liberian citizenship
Liberian footballers
Association football forwards
Liberia international footballers
Footballers from Almere
Dutch footballers
NAC Breda players
Eerste Divisie players
Dutch people of Liberian descent
Sportspeople of Liberian descent